Emilio Bello Codesido (13 July 1868 – 3 March 1963) was a Chilean lawyer, diplomat, deputy and President of the Government Junta that ruled Chile in 1925.

He was the son of Andrés Ricardo Bello, and grandson of Andres Bello, who authored the Civil Code of Chile.  He did his early studies at the Colegio inglés, the Instituto Nacional and the Universidad de Chile, graduating as a lawyer in 1889. Due to his support of president José Manuel Balmaceda during the 1891 Chilean Civil War, he was forced to exile himself. He later was allowed to return and organized the Liberal Democratic Party in Valparaiso. He was several times minister and ambassador to Bolivia and México.

After the military coup of 1925, he was elected president of a Government Junta, composed of General Pedro Dartnell and Vice Admiral Carlos Ward, while expecting the return of the constitutional president, Arturo Alessandri Palma. He continued a very active political career until his death.

References

External links
 
Analysis of his role as ambassador to Bolivia

1868 births
1941 deaths
Andrés Bello
People from Santiago
Chilean people of Canarian descent
Chilean people of Venezuelan descent
Liberal Democratic Party (Chile, 1893) politicians
Liberal Party (Chile, 1849) politicians
Heads of state of Chile
Chilean Ministers of the Interior
Foreign ministers of Chile
Chilean Ministers of Defense
Chilean Ministers of Public Works
Chilean Ministers of Justice
Members of the Chamber of Deputies of Chile
Ambassadors of Chile to Bolivia
Ambassadors of Chile to Mexico
Candidates for President of Chile
Leaders who took power by coup
University of Chile alumni
Chilean people of Spanish descent